Taylour is a surname. Notable people with the surname include:

Fay Taylour (1904–1983), known as Flying Fay, Irish motorcyclist and champion speedway rider
Hercules Taylour (1759–1790), Irish soldier and politician
Jane Taylour (1827–1905), Scottish suffragist and women's movement campaigner
Robert Taylour, Anglican priest in Ireland in the first half of the eighteenth century
William Taylour Thomson KCMG CB (1813–1883), British military officer and diplomat
Taylour Paige (born 1990), American actress and dancer
Taylour Baronets in the Peerage of Ireland
Christopher Taylour, 7th Marquess of Headfort (born 1959), Irish peer and estate agent
Geoffrey Taylour, 4th Marquess of Headfort DL, JP, FZS (1878–1943), British politician and Army officer
Michael Taylour, 6th Marquess of Headfort (1932–2005), Irish peer, aircraft salesman, politician
Thomas Taylour, 1st Earl of Bective, KP, PC (Ire) (1724–1795), Irish peer and politician
Thomas Taylour, Earl of Bective (1844–1893), Anglo-Irish Conservative politician
Thomas Taylour, 1st Marquess of Headfort KP (1757–1829), Irish peer and politician
Thomas Taylour, 2nd Marquess of Headfort KP PC (1787–1870), Anglo-Irish Whig politician
Thomas Taylour, 3rd Marquess of Headfort KP PC (I) (1822–1894), Irish peer

See also
Tailor
Tayler
Taylor (disambiguation)
Tayloria (disambiguation)